Steenberg may refer to:

 Steenberg, Cape Town, a small community in South Africa
 Steenberg railway station
 Steenberg Estate, a hotel, vineyard and golf course in Cape Town
 Steenberg (surname)